The Sharchops ("Easterner") are the populations of mixed Tibetan, Southeast Asian and South Asian descent that mostly live in the eastern districts of Bhutan.

Ethnicity
The Sharchops are an Indo-Mongoloid people who migrated from Assam, Arunachal Pradesh, or possibly Burma, c. 1200 – c. 800 BC.  Van Driem (1993) indicates that Sharchops are closely related to the Mönpa and that both are descendants of the indigenous Tibetic peoples (pre-Ngalop) of Bhutan. Due to the societal prominence and political power of Dzongkha-speaking Bhutanese, however, Sharchops are marginalized in Bhutan.  The Sharchops are the largest ethnic group in Bhutan.

Population
The Sharchops comprise most of the population of eastern Bhutan, a country whose total population in 2010 was approximately 708,500. Although they have long been the largest single ethnic group in Bhutan, the Sharchop have been largely assimilated into the culturally and politically dominant Tibetic Ngalop culture.  Together, the Ngalop, Sharchop, and tribal groups constituted up to 72 percent of the population in the late 1980s, according to official Bhutanese statistics. The 1981 census claimed that Sharchops represented 30% of the population, and Ngalops approximately 17%. The World Factbook, however, estimates that the "Bhote" Ngalop and Sharchop ethnic groups together comprise approximately 50% of Bhutan's population, at 354,200 people. Assuming Sharchops still outnumber Ngalops at a 3:2 ratio, the total population of Sharchops in Bhutan is approximately 212,500.

Language
Most Sharchops speak Tshangla, a Tibeto-Burman language; fewer speak the Olekha language. They also learn the national language, Dzongkha. Because of their proximity to Northeastern India, some speak Assamese. Bodo is also known to many of them because of socio cultural and trade relations.

Tshangla is also spoken by the Monpa (Menba) national minority across the border in China, distributed in Mêdog, Nyingchi and Dirang. Tshangla is similar to the Kalaktang and Dirang languages spoken by the Monpa of Arunachal Pradesh, India.

Lifestyle
Sharchop peoples practice slash-and-burn and tsheri agriculture, planting dry rice crops for three or four years until the soil is exhausted and then moving on, however the practice has been officially banned in Bhutan since 1969.

Most of the Sharchops follow matrilineal lines in the inheritance of land and livestock.

Religion
Most Sharchops follow Tibetan Buddhism with some elements of Bön, although those who live in the Duars follow Animism.

See also
Ethnic groups in Bhutan
Monpa people
Ngalop people
Lhotshampa
Toto people
Demographics of Bhutan

References

Ethnic groups in Bhutan
Ethnic groups in Tibet